Sakran is a town of Hub District in the Pakistani province of Balochistan. Most of the population are Balochi, Brahui,Pashto, and Sindhi. The main tribes are Bezanjo, Rakhsani, Marri, Rind, Gurginari, Mohammed Hasni, Sasoli, Qalandrani, Mengal, Meerwani, Qambrani, Shaikh, Jamot, Moondra, Wahora, and Kakar. 99% are Muslim while the remainder are Hindu and Christians.

References

Union councils of Lasbela District
Populated places in Lasbela District